Mount Hamiguitan is a mountain located in the province of Davao Oriental, Philippines. The mountain and its vicinity has one of the most diverse wildlife populations in the country. Among the wildlife found in the area are Philippine eagles and several species of Nepenthes. Some of the latter, such as the Nepenthes peltata and Nepenthes micramphora, are endemic to the area.
The mountain has a protected forest area of approximately 2,000 hectares. This woodland is noted for its unique pygmy forest of century-old trees in ultramafic soil, with many endangered, endemic and rare species of flora and fauna.

In 2014, the park was inscribed as a UNESCO World Heritage Site, becoming the first in Mindanao and the sixth in the Philippines.

Mount Hamiguitan is part of the Eastern Mindanao Biodiversity Corridor. Conservation of the mountain range is a multisectoral effort done involving the provincial government of Davao Oriental, the Department of Environment and Natural Resources, local communities, and indigenous people.

Geography
Mount Hamiguitan is located in the province of Davao Oriental in the southeastern part of the island of Mindanao, Philippines. It occupies the land area within the political boundaries of Mati, San Isidro, and Governor Generoso.

Flora and fauna

Plants
Inventory of flora species in the mountain and its vicinity showed that its montane forest has the highest species richness of plants with 462 species, followed by its dipterocarp forest with 338 species, mossy forest with 246 species and agro-system with 246 species. The mountain also harbors 45 species of orchids, 23 of which are endemic to the Philippines. Some of the plants commonly found on Mount Hamiguitan include the following:

 Leptospermum flavescens
 Wendlandia nervosa
 Tristaniopsis micrantha
 Dacrydium elatum
 Calophyllum blancoi
 Symplocos polyandra
 Almaciga (Agathis philippinensis)
 Elaeocarpus verticillatus
 Patersonia lowii
 Astronia lagunensis
 Nepenthes alata (sensu lato)
 Nepenthes hamiguitanensis
 Nepenthes justinae
 Nepenthes micramphora
 Nepenthes peltata
 Schizaea inopinata
 Schizaea malaccana
 Paphiopedilum ciliolare
 Dipodium paludosum
 Epigeneium sp.
 Dendrochilum longilabre
 Dendrochilum tenellum
 Dendrochilum sp. (unknown species)
 Macodes petola
 Coelogyne chloroptera
 Bulbophyllum sp.
 Appendicula sp.
 Gleichennia hirta
 Drimys piperita
 Hydnophyton sp.
 Dilochia deleoniae
 Lindsaea hamiguitanensis
 Ceratostylis latipetala
 Bulbophyllum colubrimodum

Animals
The International Union for Conservation of Nature (IUCN) Red List has identified at least 11 endangered vertebrate species. The Philippine Council for Agriculture, Forestry and Natural Resources and Development (PCARRD) reported that the mountain is inhabited by five endangered species, 27 rare species, 44 endemic species and 59 economically important species. The following species can be found in the area:

 Philippine eagle (Pithecop)
 Giant golden-crowned flying fox (Acerodon jubatus)
 Philippine forest roundleaf bat 
 Philippine tarsier (Tarsius syrichta)
 Philippine warty pig (Sus philippensis)
 Philippine brown deer (Cervus mariannus)
 Fischer's pygmy fruit bat (Haplonycteris fischeri)
 Asian palm civet (Paradoxurus hermaphroditus)
 Tawitawi brown-dove (Phapitreron cinereiceps) 
 Tarictic hornbill (Penelopides panini)
 Grey-hooded sunbird (Aethopyga primigenius)
 Giant scops-owl or Mindanao eagle-owl 
 Batomys hamiguitan (a yellow-brown furry-tailed rat species endemic to the area)

Designations
In 2004, Mount Hamiguitan was declared as a wildlife sanctuary through the Mount Hamiguitan Law which was enacted under the initiative of senator Loren Legarda.

In June 2014, the Mount Hamiguitan Range Wildlife Sanctuary was added to the UNESCO list of World Heritage Sites. Prior to this, the site has already been declared an ASEAN Heritage Park.

Notes

References
 Amoroso, V.B. & R.A. Aspiras 2011. Hamiguitan Range: a sanctuary for native flora. Saudi Journal of Biological Sciences'' 18(1): 7–15.

External links
 

Mountains of the Philippines
Wildlife sanctuaries of the Philippines
World Heritage Sites in the Philippines
Landforms of Davao Oriental
ASEAN heritage parks